Leslie Jonathan Mampe, Jr., (born 26 July 1985), better known by his stage name Da L.E.S, is a South African-American  hip hop recording artist and record producer. He achieved early success with his band, Jozi, and is most known for his solo single, "Heaven", which was released in 2013, and features  AKA, and Maggz.

Early life and music career
Mampe was born in Washington D.C., United States, to South African parents, Leslie Jonathan Mampe, an IT specialist who worked at IBM, and his wife, Priscilla. Mampe, Sr. was a collector of music LPs and was known for hosting parties. It is through this that Mampe discovered his musical talents at a young age, while living in the United States with his parents.

Da L.E.S. ushered in a new fun era of rap characterized by his cool kid demeanor and college swag aesthetic. It stuck and quickly became the new flavor of the streets. Les was also largely responsible for the continental success of the Ama Kip Kip brand, which he helped popularize by always flaunting them in his music videos. Most South Africans during that period wore AKK and danced to Muthaland Crunk.

According to creative-hiphop Da Les is the only African rapper whose influence covered  all three major facets of hip hop – music, clothing and lifestyle. Creative-HipHop's editor in chief, Paperman named him the most influential African Rapper of all time.

In 2014, Mampe starred in a South African television series, The Real Jozi A-Listers, as a lead character alongside South African television and media personality Maps Maponyane, both playing fictionalized versions of themselves.

Personal life
Mampe welcomed the birth of his daughter, whose godfather was South African hip hop recording artist and good friend AKA. Da L.E.S is the godfather to AKA's daughter.

Discography

Studio albums

Singles

Videography

References 

1985 births
Living people
Musicians from Washington, D.C.
Musicians from Houston
Musicians from Johannesburg
South African hip hop musicians
South African rappers
African-American male rappers
21st-century American rappers
21st-century American male musicians
21st-century African-American musicians
20th-century African-American people